WVUE may refer to:

 WVUE-DT in New Orleans, Louisiana
 WVUE (Delaware) in Delaware